This is a list of notable schools located in Somalia by region.

Primary and secondary schools
(organized by the administrative divisions of Somalia)

Gedo or Upper Jubba
Amiir Nuur Secondary, Garbaharey

Tertiary schools

See also

 Education in Somalia
 Lists of schools

References

Schools
Schools
Somalia
Somalia

Schools